Faith Nathan (born 27 July 2000) is an Australian rugby union player. She has represented her country in rugby sevens at Olympic and Commonwealth Games and at the Rugby Sevens World Cup.

Career
Nathan was named in the Australia squad for the Rugby sevens at the 2020 Summer Olympics. The team came second in the pool round but then lost to Fiji 14-12 in the quarterfinals.

Nathan won a gold medal with the Australian sevens team at the 2022 Commonwealth Games in Birmingham. She was a member of the Australian team that won the 2022 Sevens Rugby World Cup held in Cape Town, South Africa in September 2022. Against Madagascar during the tournament she became the first Australian woman to ever score five tries in one match at the rugby sevens World Cup.

References 

2000 births
Living people
Australian rugby union players
Australian female rugby sevens players
Olympic rugby sevens players of Australia
Rugby sevens players at the 2020 Summer Olympics
Rugby sevens players at the 2022 Commonwealth Games
Commonwealth Games gold medallists for Australia
Commonwealth Games medallists in rugby sevens
Medallists at the 2022 Commonwealth Games